Ana Đerek (born 4 September 1998) is a Croatian artistic gymnast, representing her nation in international competitions. She participated at the 2015 World Championships in Glasgow, and eventually qualified for 2016 Summer Olympics through the test event, held four months earlier in Rio de Janeiro.

At the 2016 Olympics in Rio de Janeiro, Đerek attained a score of 11.433 on the balance beam and a 13.200 on the floor exercises, but on vault she mistimed her steps and ran over the vaulting table, which resulted in an empty score and her withdrawal from the starting list on the uneven bars. Consequently, Đerek did not rank in the qualification phase of the individual all-around competition.

At the Doha World Cup on 25 March 2017, Đerek attained a score of 12.833 on the balance beam and a 12.900 in the floor exercise finals, winning bronze for the latter.

At the World Cup Series in Baku on 18 March 2018, Đerek scored 13.533 points on the floor exercise final to win gold.

In 2019, Đerek qualified for the 2020 Summer Olympics via the 2019 World Artistic Gymnastics Championships held in Stuttgart. In the qualification phase held in Tokyo on 25 July 2021 (postponed from 2020 because of the COVID-19 pandemic), she attained a score of 11.633 on balance beam and a 12.433 in the floor exercise.

References

External links 

1998 births
Living people
Croatian female artistic gymnasts
Sportspeople from Split, Croatia
Gymnasts at the 2015 European Games
European Games competitors for Croatia
Gymnasts at the 2016 Summer Olympics
Olympic gymnasts of Croatia
Gymnasts at the 2020 Summer Olympics
21st-century Croatian women